The Hundred Flowers Award for Best Actress was first awarded by the China Film Association in 1962.

Records

Winners & nominees

2020s

2010s

2000s

1990s

1980s

1960s

Multiple awards for Best Actress
3 awards
 Liu Xiaoqing

2 awards
 Gong Li
 Song Jia
 Zhang Ziyi

Multiple awards for Best Actress and Best Supporting Actress combined

3 awards
 Liu Xiaoqing (Three awards for Best Actress)
 Gong Li (Two awards for Best Actress, one award for Best Supporting Actress)

2 awards
 Wang Fuli (Two awards for Best Supporting Actress)
 Lü Liping (Two awards for Best Supporting Actress)
 Song Jia (Two awards for Best Actress)
 Ning Jing (One award for Best Actress, one award for Best Supporting Actress)
 Zhang Ziyi (Two awards for Best Actress)

Multiple awards for Best Actress and other categories combined
2 awards
 Zhao Wei (One award for Best Actress, one award for Best Director)

References

Hundred Flowers, Best Actress
Actress
Film awards for lead actress